Alaena kiellandi is a butterfly in the family Lycaenidae. It is found in western Tanzania. The habitat consists of rocky outcrops at altitudes between 1,000 and 1,700 metres.

References

Butterflies described in 1965
Alaena
Endemic fauna of Tanzania
Butterflies of Africa